Austrocidaris canaliculata is a species of sea urchins of the family Cidaridae. Their armour is covered with spines. Austrocidaris canaliculata was first scientifically described in 1863 by Alexander Agassiz.

References

Animals described in 1863
Cidaridae
Taxa named by Alexander Agassiz